The river Horn (French: Horn; German: Hornbach) is a left tributary of Schwarzbach flowing through the department of Moselle, in northeastern France, and the state of Rhineland-Palatinate, in southwestern Germany.

The Horn's headwaters rise in the French town of Bitche, in the Moselle Department, following a north by north-eastern course, before forming a part of the border between France and Germany. As the Franco-German border takes a sharp turn to the west, the Horn continues into Germany. Here, it follows a roughly north-western course, ending in the German town of Zweibrücken, emptying into the Schwarzbach.

See also
List of rivers of Rhineland-Palatinate

References

Rivers of Grand Est
Rivers of France
Rivers of Rhineland-Palatinate
Rivers of Moselle (department)
Rivers of Germany
France–Germany border
International rivers of Europe
Border rivers